George Carnegie-Brown (28 January 1906 – 26 March 1964) was an English cricketer.  Carnegie-Brown was a left-handed batsman.  He was born in Jerusalem, then in Ottoman Syria.

Carnegie-Brown made his debut for Cambridgeshire in the 1923 Minor Counties Championship against Buckinghamshire.  He played Minor counties cricket for Cambridgeshire from 1923 to 1931.  Carnegie-Brown studied at Cambridge University, making his first-class debut for the University Cricket Club against Nottinghamshire in 1926.  This was his only first-class appearance for the University.  The following season he played a single first-class match, this time representing the East of England cricket team against the touring New Zealanders.

He joined Dorset in 1935, who he played for up to 1939, and then after the Second World War in 1946.  Playing Minor counties cricket for Dorset allowed him to play for the Minor Counties cricket team, who he represented in 2 first-class match in 1937: against Ireland and Oxford University.  Overall, Carnegie-Brown played 4 first-class matches, although with little success.  He scored 78 runs at an average of 11.14, with a high score of 32.  He finished his county cricket career in 1947, playing 4 Minor Counties Championship matches for Lincolnshire.

He died in Lincoln, Lincolnshire on 26 March 1964.

References

External links
George Carnegie-Brown at ESPNcricinfo
George Carnegie-Brown at CricketArchive

1906 births
1964 deaths
People from Jerusalem
English cricketers
Cambridgeshire cricketers
Cambridge University cricketers
Dorset cricketers
Minor Counties cricketers
Lincolnshire cricketers
East of England cricketers